Mitaki Dam is a buttress dam located in Tottori prefecture in Japan. The dam is used for power production. The catchment area of the dam is 22.2 km2. The dam impounds about 3  ha of land when full and can store 178 thousand cubic meters of water. The construction of the dam was completed in 1936.

References

Dams in Tottori Prefecture
1936 establishments in Japan